Peter Morris may refer to:

 Peter Morris (Australian footballer) (born 1933), Australian rules footballer for Richmond
 Peter Morris (baseball) (1854–1884), Welsh baseball player
 Peter Morris (cricketer) (born 1937), New Zealand cricketer
 Peter Morris (English footballer) (born 1943), English football (soccer) player and manager
 Peter Morris (ice hockey) (born 1955), WHA ice hockey player
 Peter Morris (playwright) (born 1973), American playwright, television writer and critic
 Peter Morris (politician) (born 1932), Australian politician
 Peter Morris (surgeon) (1934–2022), transplant surgeon born in Australia
 Peter Morris (swimmer) (born 1961), English Olympic swimmer
 Peter Morris (writer) (born 1962), 1991 Scrabble World Champion and baseball historian
 Peter Morris, reporter for Melbourne television station HSV-7

See also
 Peter Morice (died 1588), Dutch-born engineer
 Peter Maurice (disambiguation)
 Peter Temple-Morris (1938–2018), British politician